The Middle East Media Research Institute (MEMRI; officially the "Middle East Media and Research Institute") is a nonprofit press monitoring and analysis organization co-founded by former Israeli military intelligence officer Yigal Carmon and Israeli-American political scientist Meyrav Wurmser. Headquartered in Washington, D.C., MEMRI publishes and distributes free English-language translations of Arabic, Persian, Urdu, Pashto, and Turkish media reports.

Critics describe MEMRI as a strongly pro-Israel advocacy group that, despite portraying itself as "independent" and "non-partisan", aims to portray the Arab and Muslim world in a negative light through the production and dissemination of incomplete or inaccurate translations and by selectively translating views of extremists while deemphasizing or ignoring mainstream opinions.

History
The institute was co-founded by former Israeli military intelligence officer, Yigal Carmon, and Meyrav Wurmser, an Israeli-born American political scientist. It was incorporated in Washington, D.C., as Middle East Media and Research Institute Inc. on December 1, 1997.

Objectives and projects
The organization indirectly gained public prominence as a source of news and analysis about the Muslim world, following the September 11 attacks and the subsequent war on terrorism by the Bush administration. According to MEMRI, its translations and reports are distributed to "congresspersons, congressional staff, policy makers, journalists, academics, and interested parties". According to PRA, MEMRI's translated articles and its commentary are routinely cited in national media outlets in the United States, including The New York Times, The Washington Post, and Los Angeles Times, while analyses by MEMRI staff and officers are frequently published by right-wing and neoconservative media outlets such as National Review, Fox News, Commentary, and the Weekly Standard. PRA writes that both critics and supporters of MEMRI note its increasing influence in shaping perceptions of the Middle East. It has maintained longstanding relations with law enforcement agencies.

Concerning this change in their 'mission statement,' Political Research Associates (PRA), which studies the US political right, notes that it occurred three weeks after the September 11 attacks, and considers MEMRI "was previously more forthcoming about its political orientation in its self-description and in staff profiles on its website". PRA considers that "MEMRI's slogan, 'Bridging the Language Gap Between the Middle East and the West,' does not convey the institute's stridently pro-Israel and anti-Arab political bias." It further notes, that MEMRI's founders, Wurmser and Carmon, "are both hardline pro-Israel ideologues aligned with Israel's Likud party". Carmon, in a public letter to Juan Cole that included a threat with a lawsuit over his comments on MEMRI, stated that he has never been affiliated with Likud. Cole answered that he hadn't alleged that, but that MEMRI would campaign for Likud goals such as the rejection of the Oslo peace process.

In 2012, Haaretz reported that Israeli intelligence agencies have reduced their monitoring the Palestinian media with MEMRI and Palestinian Media Watch now providing the Israeli government with coverage of "anti-Israel incitement" in social media, blogs and other online sources. The Prime Minister's Bureau has stated that before the government cites information provided by the two sources, the source of the material and its credibility is confirmed.

Projects 
MEMRI's work is organized into projects, each with a specific focus. The main subjects the organization addresses are jihad and terrorism; relations between the U.S. and Middle East; pro-democracy and pro-civil rights views; inter-Arab relations; and anti-Semitism.

The Reform Project, according to MEMRI, focuses on monitoring, translating, and amplifying media from Muslim figures and movements with progressive viewpoints in the Arab and Muslim world. The project also aims to provide a platform for those sources to expand their reach. MEMRI has stated that this is the organization's flagship project.

The MEMRI Lantos Archives on anti-Semitism and Holocaust Denial, a joint project with the Lantos Foundation for Human Rights and Justice launched in 2009, is a repository of translated Arabic and Farsi material on anti-Semitism. The project is sponsored by the U.S. State Department. Through its translations and research, the project aims to document anti-Semitic trends in the Middle East and South Asia. The project provides policymakers with translations and footage of anti-Semitic comments made by media personalities, academics, and government and religious leaders. MEMRI holds an annual Capitol Hill gathering through the project, and publishes an annual report on anti-Semitism and Holocaust denial. The archives were named for Tom Lantos, the only Holocaust survivor to serve in United States Congress.

Arab and Iranian television programming is monitored, translated, and analyzed through the MEMRI TV Monitoring Project. The project's translated video clips are available to the media and general public.

Activity by terrorist and violent extremist organizations is tracked through the Jihad and Terrorism Threat Monitor (JTTM). The project disseminates jihadi-associated social media content and propaganda released by various Islamic State media companies.

The organization's Cyber and Jihad Lab (CJL) tracks cyberterrorism. According to MEMRI, the CJL's goal is to inform and make recommendations to legislators and the business community about the threat of cyberterrorism. Initiatives have included encouraging social media companies to remove terrorist accounts and sought legislation to prevent terrorist entities from using their platforms.

MEMRI's other projects include the Russian Media Studies Project, which translates Russian media and publishes reports analyzing Russian political ideology, the Iran Studies Project, the South Asia Studies Project, and the 9/11 Documentation Project.

Languages

According to its website, MEMRI provides translations and analysis of Arabic, Farsi, Dari, Urdu, Pashto, and Turkish media. It has recently added a Russian media translation project.

MEMRI provides translations into and analysis in English, French, Polish, Japanese, Spanish, and Hebrew.

Financial support
MEMRI is a 501(c)(3) non-profit organization. MEMRI has a policy of not accepting money from governments, relying instead on around 250 private donors, including other organizations and foundations.

MediaTransparency, an organization that monitors the financial ties of conservative think tanks to conservative foundations in the United States, reported that for the years 1999 to 2004, MEMRI received $100,000 from The Lynde and Harry Bradley Foundation, Inc., $100,000 from The Randolph Foundation, and $5,000 from the John M. Olin Foundation.

MEMRI recognized US$6,292,683 of revenue and incurred US$6,247,476 of expenses during the twelve months ended June 30, 2018. Charity Navigator, an organization that evaluates the financial health of America's largest charities, has given MEMRI three stars out of a possible four.

In August 2011, the United States Department of State's Office of International Religious Freedom in the Bureau of Democracy, Human Rights and Labor, awarded MEMRI a $200,000 grant.

Reception
The organization's translations are regularly quoted by major international newspapers, and its work has generated strong criticism and praise. Critics have accused MEMRI of producing inaccurate, unreliable translations with undue emphasis and selectivity in translating and disseminating the most extreme views from Arabic and Persian media, which portray the Arab and Muslim world in a negative light, while ignoring moderate views that are often found in the same media outlets. Other critics charge that while MEMRI does sometimes translate pro-US or pro-democracy voices in the regional media, it systematically leaves out intelligent criticism of Western-style democracy, US and Israeli policy and secularism.

MEMRI's work has been criticized on three grounds: that their work is biased; that they choose articles to translate selectively so as to give an unrepresentative view of the media they are reporting on; and that some of their translations are inaccurate. MEMRI has responded to the criticism, stating that their work is not biased; that they in fact choose representative articles from the Arab media that accurately reflect the opinions expressed, and that their translations are highly accurate.

Accusations of bias
Brian Whitaker, then the Middle East editor for The Guardian, wrote in a public email debate with Carmon in 2003, that his problem with MEMRI was that it "poses as a research institute when it's basically a propaganda operation". Earlier, Whitaker had charged that MEMRI's role was to "further the political agenda of Israel." and that MEMRI's website does not mention Carmon's employment for Israeli intelligence, or Meyrav Wurmser's political stance, which he described as an "extreme brand of Zionism". Carmon responded to this by stating that his employment history is not a secret and was not political, as he served under opposing administrations of the Israeli government and that perhaps the issue was that he was Israeli: "If your complaint is that I am Israeli, then please say so." Carmon also questioned Whitaker's own biases, wondering if Whitaker's is biased in favor of Arabs – as his website on the Middle East is named "Al-Bab" ("The Gateway" in Arabic) – stating: "I wonder how you would judge an editor whose website was called "Ha-Sha-ar" ("The Gateway" in Hebrew)?

In 2006, MEMRI released an interview with Norman Finkelstein on Lebanese Al Jadeed in which he discussed his book The Holocaust Industry which made it appear as if Finkelstein was questioning the death toll of the holocaust. Finkelstein  said in response that MEMRI edited the television interview he gave in Lebanon in order to falsely impute that he was a Holocaust denier. In an interview with the newspaper In Focus in 2007, he said MEMRI uses "the same sort of propaganda techniques as the Nazis" and "take[s] things out of context in order to do personal and political harm to people they don't like".

Selectivity
Several critics have accused MEMRI of selectivity. They state that MEMRI consistently picks the most extreme views for translation and dissemination, which portray the Arab and Muslim world in a negative light, while ignoring moderate views that are often found in the same media outlets. Juan Cole, a professor of Modern Middle East History at the University of Michigan, argues MEMRI has a tendency to "cleverly cherry-pick the vast Arabic press, which serves 300 million people, for the most extreme and objectionable articles and editorials ... On more than one occasion I have seen, say, a bigoted Arabic article translated by MEMRI and when I went to the source on the web, found that it was on the same op-ed page with other, moderate articles arguing for tolerance. These latter were not translated." Former head of the CIA's counterintelligence unit, Vincent Cannistraro, said that MEMRI "are selective and act as propagandists for their political point of view, which is the extreme-right of Likud. They simply don't present the whole picture." Laila Lalami, writing in The Nation, states that MEMRI "consistently picks the most violent, hateful rubbish it can find, translates it and distributes it in email newsletters to media and members of Congress in Washington." As a result, critics such as UK Labour politician Ken Livingstone state that MEMRI's analyses are distortion.

A report by Center for American Progress, titled "Fear, Inc.: The Roots of the Islamophobia Network in America" lists MEMRI as promoting Islamophobic propaganda in the USA through supplying selective translations that are relied upon by several organisations "to make the case that Islam is inherently violent and promotes extremism."

MEMRI argues that they are quoting the government-controlled press and not obscure or extremist publications, a fact their critics acknowledge, according to Marc Perelman: "When we quote Al-Ahram in Egypt, it is as if we were quoting The New York Times. We know there are people questioning our work, probably those who have difficulties seeing the truth. But no one can show anything wrong about our translations."

In August 2013, the Islamic Da'wah Centre of South Australia questioned the "reliability, independence and veracity" of MEMRI after it posted what the Islamic Da'wah Centre called a "sensational de-contextualised cut-and-paste video clip ... put together in a suggestive manner" of a sermon by the Sheikh Sharif Hussein on an American website. According to the two-minute video, which was a heavily condensed version of the Sheikh's 36-minute speech delivered in Adelaide on 22 March, Hussein called Australian and American soldiers "crusader pigs" and stated "O Allah, count the Buddhists and the Hindus one by one. O Allah, count them and kill them to the very last one." According to MEMRI's translation, he also described U.S. President Barack Obama as an "enemy of Allah, you who kiss the shoes and feet of the Jews" and predicted that "The day will come when you are trampled upon by the pure feet of the Muslims." MEMRI's rendition moved leading Liberal senator Cory Bernardi to write to the Police Commissioner charging that under Australia's anti-terrorism laws, the video clip was "hate speech", and requesting that action be taken against Hussein. The South Australian Islamic Society and the Australian Buddhist Councils Federation also condemned Hussein's speech. Widespread calls from the public for the deportation of Hussein and his family followed news reports of the video. A police spokeswoman stated "Police will examine the entire content of the sermon to gain the full context and determine whether any crime has been committed." Hussein himself declined any comment on the contents of the video. However, the Da'wah Centre charged that by omitting the context of Hussein's statements, MEMRI had distorted the actual intent of the speech. While admitting that the Sheikh was emotional and used strong words, the Centre stated that the speech was delivered in relation to rape cases in Iraq, the birth defects due to use of depleted uranium, and the Burmese Buddhist massacre. This, the Centre said, was omitted from the edited MEMRI video.

Translation accuracy and controversy

MEMRI's translations are considered  "usually accurate" though occasionally disputed and highly selective in what it chooses to translate and in which context it puts things, as in the case of MEMRI's translation of a 2004 Osama bin Laden video, which MEMRI defended, which it said indicated that any individual US state that did not vote for President George W. Bush "guarantees its own security," implying a threat against those states that did vote for him; outside translators, and the original article that the MEMRI alert claimed to correct, indicated that Bin Laden was threatening nations, not individual US states.

Following the 7 July 2005 London bombings, Al Jazeera invited Hani al-Sebai, an Islamist living in Britain, to take part in a discussion on the event. Al-Sibai is listed as a Specially Designated National by the US Treasury Department because of alleged support for al-Qaida. For one segment of the discussion in regard to the victims, MEMRI provided the following translation of al-Sebai's words:

Al-Sebai subsequently claimed that MEMRI had mistranslated his interview, and that among other errors, he had actually said:

By leaving out the condemnation of the "killing of innocents" entirely, Mohammed El Oifi, writing in Le Monde diplomatique, argued that this translation left the implication that civilians (the innocent) are considered a legitimate target. Several British newspapers subsequently used MEMRI's translation to run headlines such as "Islamic radical has praised the suicide bomb attacks on the capital" prompting al-Sebai to demand an apology and take legal action. In his view, MEMRI's translation was also "an incitement to have me arrested by the British authorities".

Halim Barakat described MEMRI as "a propaganda organization dedicated to representing Arabs and Muslims as anti-Semites". Barakat claims an essay he wrote for the Al-Hayat Daily of London titled "The Wild Beast that Zionism Created: Self-Destruction", was mistranslated by MEMRI and retitled as "Jews Have Lost Their Humanity". Barakat further stated "Every time I wrote 'Zionism', MEMRI replaced the word by 'Jew' or 'Judaism'. They want to give the impression that I'm not criticizing Israeli policy, but that what I'm saying is anti-Semitic." According to Barakat, he was subject to widespread condemnation from faculty and his office was "flooded with hatemail". Fellow Georgetown faculty member Aviel Roshwald accused Barakat in an article he published of promoting a "demonization of Israel and of Jews". Supported by Georgetown colleagues, Barakat denied the claim, which Roshwald had based on MEMRI's translation of Barakat's essay.

In 2007, CNN correspondent Atika Shubert and Arabic translators accused MEMRI of mistranslating portions of a Palestinian children's television program:

Naomi Sakr, a professor of Media Policy at the University of Westminster has charged that specific MEMRI mistranslations, occurring during times of international tension, have generated hostility towards Arab journalists.

In an email debate with Carmon, Whitaker asked about MEMRI's November 2000 translation of an interview given by the Grand Mufti of Jerusalem to Al-Ahram al-Arabi. One question asked by the interviewer was: "How do you deal with the Jews who are besieging al-Aqsa and are scattered around it?" which was translated as: "How do you feel about the Jews?" MEMRI cut out the first part of the reply and combined it with the answer to the next question, which, Whitaker claimed, made "Arabs look more anti-Semitic than they are". Carmon admitted this was an error in translation but defended combining the two replies, as both questions referred to the same subject. Carmon rejected other claims of distortion by Whitaker, saying: "it is perhaps reassuring that you had to go back so far to find a mistake ... You accused us of distortion by omission but when asked to provide examples of trends and views we have missed, you have failed to answer." Carmon also accused Whitaker of "using insults rather than evidence" in his criticism of MEMRI.

Response by MEMRI
MEMRI responds to criticism by saying that the media had a tendency to whitewash statements of Arab leaders, and regularly defends its translations as being representative of actual ME viewpoints, even when the translations themselves are disputed: "MEMRI has never claimed to 'represent the view of the Arabic media', but rather to reflect, through our translations, general trends which are widespread and topical."

Praise for MEMRI
In 2003 John Lloyd defended MEMRI in the New Statesman:

In a 2005 piece Thomas L. Friedman, a political opinion columnist for The New York Times, praised MEMRI, and credited MEMRI with helping to "shine a spotlight on hate speech wherever it appears". Friedman has written in The New York Times that "what I respect about Memri is that it translates not only the ugly stuff but the courageous liberal, reformist Arab commentators as well." In addition, he has cited MEMRI's translations in his op-eds.

In 2002 Brit Hume of Fox News said, "These people tell you what's going on in pulpits and in the state-controlled TV. If you have indoctrination, it's important to know about it."

Jay Nordlinger, the managing editor of National Review, wrote in 2002:

See also

 Hasbara
 Media coverage of the Arab–Israeli conflict
 Palestinian Media Watch

Notes

References

Bibliography
 .

External links
 
 MEMRI's official pages on Facebook, YouTube, and Twitter

Propaganda in Israel
Charities based in Washington, D.C.
Media analysis organizations and websites
Middle Eastern studies in the United States
Non-governmental organizations involved in the Israeli–Palestinian conflict
Organizations established in 1998
Zionism in the United States
Media coverage of the Arab–Israeli conflict